This is a list of notable theatre companies, performance venues, and rental performance spaces in the Chicago area.

Chicago area theatre venues and organizations

Resident companies and venues

 About Face
 Accidental Shakespeare 
 Aguijón Theater 
 American Blues Theater 
 Annoyance Theatre 
 Baliwick Theatre Company
 Black Ensemble Theater Company 
 BoHo Theatre 
 Boxer Rebellion Theatre Company
 Center on Halsted 
 Chicago Dramatists 
 Chicago Shakespeare Theater 
 Chopin Theatre 
 Citadel Theatre (Lake Forest) 
 Copernicus Center (formerly Gateway Theatre) 
 Court Theatre 
 Factory Theater 
 First Folio Theatre (Oak Brook) 
 Goodman Theatre 
 iO Theater 
 Kane Repertory Theatre (St. Charles) 
 Lifeline Theatre 
 Lookingglass Theatre Company 
 Marriott Theatre (Lincolnshire) 
 MCA Stage 
 Merle Reskin Theatre (DePaul) (formerly Blackstone Theater) 
 Music Theater Works (formerly Light Opera Works) (Evanston) 
 Neo-Futurists 
 Oak Park Festival Theatre (Oak Park) 
 Oracle Theatre Company
 Opera in Focus (Rolling Meadows) 
 Organic Theater Company 
 Paramount Theatre (Aurora) 
 The Playground 
 Porchlight Music Theatre 
 A Red Orchid Theatre 
 Red Tape Theatre 
 Red Theater Chicago 
 Remy Bumppo Theatre Company 
 The Second City 
 Shattered Globe Theatre Company
 Silk Road Rising 
 Steep Theatre Company 
 Steppenwolf Theatre Company 
 Strawdog Theatre Company 
 Theatre-Hikes
 TimeLine Theatre Company 
 Trap Door Theatre 
 Victory Gardens Theater

Itinerant companies

 Babes With Blades 
 Child's Play Touring Theatre 
 Collaboraction 
 ETA Creative Arts Foundation 
 The House Theatre of Chicago 
 LiveWire Chicago Theatre 
 Off-Off Campus (UChicago) 
 Red Theater Chicago 
 Theater Oobleck (formerly Streetlight Theater) 
 TUTA Theatre

Touring and rental venues

 Apollo Theater Chicago 
 Arie Crown Theatre 
 Auditorium Theatre 
 Briar Street Theater 
 Broadway Playhouse at Water Tower Place (formerly Drury Lane Water Tower Place) 
 Cadillac Palace Theatre 
 Chicago Theatre 
 CIBC Theatre (formerly The Shubert Theatre) 
 Congress Theater 
 Greenhouse Theater Center 
 Harris Theater (Chicago) 
 James M. Nederlander Theatre (formerly Oriental Theatre) 
 Lyric Opera of Chicago 
 Rosemont Theater

Inactive, historic companies and venues
Companies
 American Theater Company
  Body Politic Theater
 Caffeine Theatre 
 Chicago Center for the Performing Arts
 Compass Players
 Defiant Theatre
 The Ethiopian Art Theatre/Players
 Famous Door Theatre
 Goat Island
 Happy Happy Good Show
 The Hypocrites 
 Illinois Theatre Center
 Improv Institute
 Infamous Commonwealth Theatre
 Mary-Arrchie Theatre Company
 New Age Vaudeville
 New Variety
 Playwrights Theatre Club
 Pyewacket Theatre Company
 The Practical Theatre Company
 Remains Theatre
 Redmoon Theater
 Wayward Productions (formerly Chicago Fusion Theatre) 
 Windy City Performs

Venues
 Drury Lane Theatres
 Garrick Theater
 Iroquois Theatre
 Theatre Building Chicago (Purchased by Stage 773)
 Uptown Theatre

References

 
Chicago
Theater
Theaters in Chicago